Marcia Van Dyke (March 26, 1922 – November 11, 2002) was an American violinist and actress. She was featured in a cover story in the January 19, 1948, issue of Life magazine.

Early years
The daughter of Mr. and Mrs. Edward S. Van Dyke, she was born Marcia Evelyn Van Dyke in Grants Pass, Oregon and was a cousin of director and writer W. S. Van Dyke. Her father was an attorney who taught piano as a hobby.

In 1936, she and her parents moved to Burlingame, California, to allow her to study under Naoum Blinder, the concert maestro of the San Francisco Symphony Orchestra. Van Dyke was concertmeister for Burlingame High School and for the Southern Oregon Symphony. She graduated from BHS and San Mateo Junior College.

Music
In 1944, Van Dyke joined the first violin section of the San Francisco Symphony. Before taking that position, she was first violinist for a theater in San Francisco.

Van Dyke was part of a 56-concert tour (in 57 days) that the San Francisco Symphony undertook in the spring of 1947. An article published on the San Francisco Chronicle's SFGate website on November 13, 2011, reported "After the tour, Life magazine ran a story not on the orchestra itself, but on 'the prettiest first violinist now in the symphony big time.'"

Acting

Film
Film executive Joe Pasternak offered a contract to Van Dyke after seeing the 1947 article about her in Life.

Van Dyke's fledgling film career was briefly endangered on December 25, 1947, when a car in which she was a passenger had a head-on collision with another car near Taft, California. A news story distributed by International News Service noted that Van Dyke was "being groomed by MGM for stardom" at the time. It continued: "An ugly cut encircled her left eye and her lovely features became grotesquely swollen. For a while it looked as if Marcia's film career had been nipped in the bud." On December 30, 1947, however, she said that she was progressing sufficiently to resume film activity within a month.

Van Dyke's films included Shadow on the Wall (1950), A Date with Judy (1948), In the Good Old Summertime (1949), and Death in a Doll House.

Stage
On Broadway, Van Dyke played Katie in A Tree Grows in Brooklyn (1951). Her performance in that role brought her a Theatre World Award for 1950–1951 and a fourth-place finish for best supporting actress in the 1951 Donaldson Awards competition.

After Van Dyke's debut in A Tree Grows in Brooklyn, an item in the trade publication Billboard said, in part, "She has looks along with more than considerable acting ability, and, while her voice is small, it has splendid quality."

Radio
In 1953, Van Dyke and her then-husband, Jack Barry, starred with their son, Jeff, in It's the Barrys, a 15-minute comedy program on NBC radio.

Coverage in Life magazine
Life magazine twice ran articles about Van Dyke. The May 5, 1947, issue contained an article titled "Pretty First Violinist: Young Marcia Van Dyke is a musical ornament in San Francisco Symphony's string section". It noted that Van Dyke had not only played for six years with professional orchestras, but had also sung torch songs in nightclubs.

The January 19, 1948, issue of Life contained a second article about Van Dyke: "Virtuoso Starlet: 'Prettiest first violinist' now is a versatile Hollywood actress'". Accompanied by 11 photographs, it reported that Van Dyke had received a film contract with Metro-Goldwyn-Mayer. It added that she had "considerably more to offer Hollywood than her pretty face", noting her talents in singing, playing tennis, and swimming.

On January 10, 2014, Time magazine, the sister publication of the by-then-defunct Life, evaluated Life's coverage of Van Dyke. Liz Ronk wrote:Van Dyke, as multi-talented as she might have been, only worked in Hollywood for six years, and never in a starring role. Still, no one could possibly consider her a failure; after all, countless young actresses yearn to act in the movies, or on television, and never get a chance to step in front of a camera. So while Marcia Van Dyke might not have had the blockbuster onscreen career that her LIFE cover suggested was in store, at least she had her moment -- in fact, she had several moments -- in the sun.

Later years
In the 1970s, Van Dyke returned her attention to music, playing as a session musician for recordings by a variety of artists, including Carole King, Cleo Laine, George Duke, The Gap Band, and Earth, Wind & Fire.

Personal life
On August 19, 1941, Van Dyke married David Vaughn Colbert, a United States Marine. In July 1952, she married television game show host Jack Barry. They had two sons, Jeffrey and Jonathan. On November 16, 1962, Van Dyke married John H. Mitchell, an executive with Screen Gems studios.

Death
On November 11, 2002, Van Dyke died at her home in Ashland, Oregon. She was 80 years old.

References

External links 

 

1922 births
2002 deaths
American film actresses
American stage actresses
Actresses from Grants Pass, Oregon
20th-century American actresses
American violinists
Musicians from Oregon
College of San Mateo alumni
Musicians from the San Francisco Bay Area
20th-century violinists